Ronald Eugene Knight (born August 4, 1947) is a retired American professional basketball forward who spent two seasons in the National Basketball Association both with the Portland Trail Blazers. He was a member of the inaugural 1970–71 Blazers team after being drafted in the fifth round (76th pick overall) from California State University, Los Angeles during the 1970 NBA Draft.

External links

1947 births
Living people
American men's basketball players
Basketball players from Compton, California
Cal State Los Angeles Golden Eagles men's basketball players
Harlem Globetrotters players
Portland Trail Blazers draft picks
Portland Trail Blazers players
Power forwards (basketball)
Small forwards